WBWL may refer to:

 WBWL (FM), a radio station (101.7 FM) licensed to serve Lynn, Massachusetts, United States
 WBOB (AM), a radio station (600 AM) licensed to serve Jacksonville, Florida, United States, which held the call sign WBWL from 1996 to 2010